Roger Lebranchu (born 22 July 1922) is a French rower. He competed in the men's eight event at the 1948 Summer Olympics. During World War II, Lebranchu was imprisoned for two years in two concentration camps before escaping.

References

External links
 

1922 births
Living people
French centenarians
French male rowers
Men centenarians
Olympic rowers of France
Rowers at the 1948 Summer Olympics
Sportspeople from Neuilly-sur-Seine